Kukunjevac  is a village in Croatia. 

Populated places in Požega-Slavonia County
Lipik